Edward Charles Whelan (August 6, 1919 – December 11, 2007) was a political figure in Saskatchewan, Canada. He represented Regina City from 1960 to 1964, Regina North from 1964 to 1967 and Regina North West from 1967 to 1979 in the Legislative Assembly of Saskatchewan as firstly a Co-operative Commonwealth Federation party member and then as a New Democratic Party member.

He was born in Amherstburg, Ontario, the son of Charles Bernard Whelan and Frances Kelly, and was educated in local schools and at the Toronto Technical School. Whelan took over the operation of the family farm following the death of his father. Later, he worked as a machinist in automobile plants in Windsor. Whelan moved to Saskatchewan in 1943 and took up farming there. In 1948, he married Pemrose Henry. Whelan served in the provincial cabinet as Minister of Mineral Resources and as Minister of Consumer Affairs.

With his wife, he published a book on the life of Tommy Douglas, Touched by Tommy.

His brother Eugene served in the House of Commons, and became a Cabinet minister and Senator.

Electoral record

Regina City (4 members)

Regina North

Regina North West

References 

Saskatchewan Co-operative Commonwealth Federation MLAs
20th-century Canadian politicians
1919 births
2007 deaths